In civil procedure a penal notice is a warning endorsed on a court order, which notifies the recipient is liable to committal to prison or to pay a fine for breach of the order.  In the case of a company or corporation, their assets may be seized.

References

Sources

External links

 Divorce glossary entry 

Civil procedure
Criminal law